Upper Stone is a rural locality in the Shire of Hinchinbrook, Queensland, Australia. In the  Upper Stone had a population of 87 people.

Geography 
The north-western and western edge of the locality are within Girringun National Park which extends into neighbouring Lannercost, Wallaman and Mount Fox.

Stoneleigh is a neighbourhood in the north of the locality.

History 
In the  Upper Stone had a population of 87 people.

Community groups 
The Upper Stone branch of the Queensland Country Women's Association meets at 19 Stoneleigh Road.

References 

Shire of Hinchinbrook
Localities in Queensland